Cuangoblemma is a monotypic genus of Angolan araneomorph spiders in the family Tetrablemmidae containing the single species, Cuangoblemma machadoi. It was first described by Paolo Marcello Brignoli in 1974, and is found in Angola.

See also
 List of Tetrablemmidae species

References

Monotypic Araneomorphae genera
Spiders of Africa
Tetrablemmidae